Marion Township is an inactive township in Cole County, in the U.S. state of Missouri.

Marion Township most likely took its name from Marion, Missouri.

References

Townships in Missouri
Townships in Cole County, Missouri
Jefferson City metropolitan area